Microgonia is a genus of moths in the family Geometridae.

External links

Geometridae